Creedia haswelli is a species of sandburrowers found in Southern Australia.

Etymology
The sandburrower is named in honor of Scots-born Australian zoologist William Aitcheson Haswell.

References

Creediidae
Fish of Australia
Taxa named by Edward Pierson Ramsay
Fish described in 1881